Farm Island Lake is a lake in the U.S. state of Minnesota, located in Aitkin County north of Mille Lacs Lake. It is just west of U.S. Route 169. Zebra mussels, an invasive species, have been found there.

Its name refers to traditional farming of islands in the lake by Ojibwe people. They also hunted, fished, and harvested wild rice.

The Minnesota Department of Natural Resources maintains Farm Island State Wildlife Management Area and two public boat launches on the lake.

See also
List of lakes in Minnesota

References

External links 
Farm Island Lake Improvement Association
Minnesota DNR Fisheries Lake Survey: Farm Island

Lakes of Aitkin County, Minnesota
Lakes of Minnesota